Franklin Warren "Fritz" Hobbs, IV (born July 30, 1947) is an American rower who competed in the 1968 Summer Olympics and in the 1972 Summer Olympics.

He was born in Manchester, New Hampshire and is the older brother of rower Bill Hobbs.

In 1968 he was a crew member of the American boat which finished sixth in the eight event. Four years later he won the silver medal with the American boat in the 1972 eights competition.

Education and business career
Fritz Hobbs was educated at the Milton Academy (1965), Harvard College (1969) and the Harvard Business School (1972), after which he spent the next 25 years with the investment banking firm of Dillon Read & Co., the last five of which he was Chief Executive Officer. When Dillon Read merged with SBC Warburg, and subsequently with Union Bank of Switzerland, Hobbs continued as Chairman of the resulting UBS Warburg. He then moved to Houlihan Lokey as CEO. He has been a director of Molson Coors, Lord Abbett, Ally Financial, BAWAG, and other corporations, as well as serving on the Boards of Harvard University and Milton Academy.

References

External links
 

1947 births
Living people
Rowers at the 1968 Summer Olympics
Rowers at the 1972 Summer Olympics
Olympic silver medalists for the United States in rowing
American chief executives of financial services companies
American male rowers
Harvard Business School alumni
Milton Academy alumni
Medalists at the 1972 Summer Olympics
Pan American Games medalists in rowing
Pan American Games gold medalists for the United States
Harvard College alumni
Rowers at the 1967 Pan American Games
European Rowing Championships medalists
Harvard Crimson rowers